Grace Mahary (born May 23, 1989) is a Canadian model.

Early life
Mahary was born in Edmonton, Alberta, Canada, to Eritrean parents. When she was  young she played basketball with her two older brothers at the Archbishop O'Leary Catholic High School where she was studying. She can speak English, French and Tigrinya.

In 2005, she won the Elle Canada/Quebec Model Search and began modeling locally the following year.

In 2009, she starred in Trey Songz's I Invented Sex/Say Aah music video.

In 2011, she travelled to Paris in order to start an international career in modeling. Her breakthrough came in March 2012, when she walked for Givenchy as an exclusive.

Career
In 2014, she walked the Victoria's Secret Fashion Show.

She has advertised Bergdorf Goodman, Carolina Herrera, Gap, Hugo Boss, Michael Kors, Nordstrom, Opening Ceremony and Prabal Gurung.

Throughout her career, she walked more than 200 runways including 3.1 Phillip Lim, Alberta Ferretti, Alexander Wang, Alexandre Vauthier, Altuzarra, Balenciaga, Balmain, BCBG Max Azria, Bottega Veneta, Céline, Chanel, Christopher Kane, Diane von Fürstenberg, Diesel Black Gold, Dior, DKNY, Dries van Noten, Dsquared2, EDUN, Emilio Pucci, Erdem, Ermanno Scervino, Fendi, Gareth Pugh, Giles, Giorgio Armani, Givenchy, H&M, Helmut Lang, Hervé Léger, Hugo Boss, Hussein Chalayan, Isabel Marant, Jill Stuart, Jonathan Saunders, Kenneth Cole, Kenzo, L'Wren Scott, Lacoste, Lanvin, Loewe, Louis Vuitton, Maison Martin Margiela, Marc Jacobs, Mary Katrantzou, Matthew Williamson, Max Mara, Michael Kors, Miu Miu, Moschino, Narciso Rodriguez, Nina Ricci, Oscar de la Renta, Paco Rabanne, Paul & Joe, Peter Som, Philip Treacy, Philipp Plein, Prabal Gurung, Prada, Proenza Schouler, Reed Krakoff, Richard Chai, Richard Nicoll, Roberto Cavalli, Salvatore Ferragamo, Tommy Hilfiger, Topshop, Valentino,  Vera Wang, Victoria's Secret, Viktor & Rolf, Y-3, Yigal Azrouël, Yves Saint Laurent, Zac Posen.

References

External links

1989 births
Female models from Alberta
People from Edmonton
Living people
IMG Models models
Canadian people of Eritrean descent